The 2011–12 Gardner–Webb Runnin' Bulldogs men's basketball team represented Gardner–Webb University during the 2011–12 NCAA Division I men's basketball season. Their head coach was Chris Holtmann. The Runnin' Bulldogs played their home games at the Paul Porter Arena and are members of the Big South Conference. They finished the season 12–20, 6–12 in Big South play to finish in tenth place and lost in the first round of the Big South tournament to High Point.

Roster

Source:  2011–12 Gardner-Webb Men's Basketball Roster

Schedule

|-
!colspan=9 style=| Regular season

|-
!colspan=9 style=| Big South Conference tournament

Source:  2011–12 Gardner-Webb Men's Basketball Schedule

References

Gardner-Webb Runnin' Bulldogs
Gardner–Webb Runnin' Bulldogs men's basketball seasons
Gardner-Webb Runnin' Bulldogs men's basketball
Gardner-Webb Runnin' Bulldogs men's basketball